Matthew McClelland (November 1832 – January 30, 1883) was a United States Navy sailor and a recipient of the United States military's highest decoration the Medal of Honor for his actions in the American Civil War.

Military service

Matthew McClelland was born November 1832 in Ireland. McClelland enlisted July 12, 1861 for three years and served on the USS North Carolina from that date to July 27, 1861 as a Second Class Fireman. He then served on the USS Richmond from July 28, 1861 to August 29, 1864 as a First Class Fireman and the USS Princeton from August 30, 1864 to honorable discharge on September 9, 1864.

During the Civil War, McClelland served as a First Class Fireman aboard the steamship . As a fireman, McClelland's duties were to tend to the ship's steam boilers.

In the prelude to the siege of Port Hudson, Louisiana, Rear Admiral David Farragut attempted to move a flotilla of ships, including the Richmond, up the Mississippi River past the town of Port Hudson. On March 14, 1863, the flotilla reached the town and came under heavy fire from Confederate artillery batteries. The enemy guns inflicted severe damage on the Union flotilla, forcing most of the ships to turn back.

During the battle, the Richmonds fireroom, which housed its boilers, was damaged by an enemy shell and began to fill with hot steam. McClelland entered the room and "hauled the fires", or put out the furnaces, to prevent further danger. For his actions he was awarded the Medal of Honor four months later, on July 10, 1863.

Medal of Honor citation
Rank and organization: First Class Fireman, U.S. Navy. Accredited to: New York. G.O. No.: 17, 10 July 1863.McClelland's official Medal of Honor Citation reads:'

Serving on board the U.S.S. Richmond in the attack on Port Hudson, 14 March 1863. Damaged by a 6-inch solid rifle shot which shattered the starboard safety-valve chamber and also damaged the port safety-valve, the fireroom of the Richmond immediately became filled with steam to place it in an extremely critical condition. Acting courageously in this crisis, McClelland persisted in penetrating the steam-filled room in order to haul the hot fires of the furnaces and continued this gallant action until the gravity of the situation had lessened.

Death and burial

Medal of Honor recipient Matthew McClelland died of pulmonary catarrh & irritation of the heart and his remains were initially stored at the vault of Lafayette Cemetery in Philadelphia, Pennsylvania on February 4, 1883. His remains were then transferred February 5, 1883 to Mount Moriah Cemetery, Philadelphia, Pennsylvania and buried February 11, 1883.

McClelland's death notice in the February 3, 1883 Philadelphia Inquirer newspaper read:
McCLELLAN, - On the 30th ult., MATTHEW McCLELLAN, in the fifty-first year of his age. The relatives and friends of the family, also Energetic Lodge, No. 643, IOOF; Great Western Division, No. 334, Sons of Temperance; G.W. Town Post, No. 46, G.A.R.; employees of  League Island Navy Yard, are respectfully invited to attend the funeral, on Sunday afternoon, at 2 o'clock, from his late residence, No. 1026 Dickinson street. To proceed to Lafayette Cemetery.

In 2006, the Medal of Honor Historical Society of the United States incorrectly assumed that McClelland's body had been moved from Lafayette Cemetery in Philadelphia to Evergreen Memorial Park in Bensalem, Pennsylvania during the mass reinterment in 1947. Evergreen Memorial Park went out of business and became part of Rosedale Cemetery in 1960. A VA Medal of Honor grave marker was placed near the mass grave in Rosedale Cemetery in error. His actual burial site at Mount Moriah Cemetery was discovered in 2015.

See also

 Joseph E. Vantine
 List of Medal of Honor recipients
 List of American Civil War Medal of Honor recipients: M-P

References

1832 births
1883 deaths
American Civil War recipients of the Medal of Honor
Burials at Mount Moriah Cemetery (Philadelphia)
Military personnel from Philadelphia
People of Pennsylvania in the American Civil War
Union Navy sailors
United States Navy Medal of Honor recipients